Events in the year 1900 in Norway.

Incumbents
Monarch: Oscar II
Prime Minister: Johannes Steen

Events

 17 February – The Norwegian Ministry of Agriculture and Food is established
 21 November – the Norwegian Employers' Association was founded.
 3 December – Population Census: There were 2,239,881 inhabitants in Norway.
 The 1900 Parliamentary election takes place.

Popular culture

Sports

Music

Film

Literature

Notable births

5 January – Nina Eik-Nes, politician (died 1997)
31 January – Bertel Flaten, politician (died 1963)
14 February – Ola Johan Gjengedal, politician (died 1992)
4 March – Axel Coldevin, historian (died 1992).
15 March – Christian Schweigaard Stang, linguistics researcher and professor (died 1977)
16 March – Ragnhild Larsen, diver (died 1969)
26 March – Ivar Jacobsen Norevik, politician (died 1956)
28 March – Olav Marensius Strandås, politician (died 1981)
17 April – Ejnar Torgensen, sailor and Olympic silver medallist (died 1932)
10 May – Gunvald Engelstad, politician (died 1972)
13 May – Frithjof Bettum, jurist and politician (died 1984)
1 June – Bjarne Råsberg, photographer (died 1942)
12 June – Hjalmar Nygaard, boxer (died 1937)
13 June – Johan Støa, multi-sportsman (died 1991)
30 June – Knut Rød, police officer responsible for the transfer of Jewish people to SS troops in Oslo, acquitted (died 1986)
5 July – Ole Hegge, cross country skier and Olympic silver medallist (died 1994)
17 July – Eilert Bøhm, gymnast and Olympic silver medallist (died 1982)
18 July – Karsten Fonstad, politician.
21 July – Ole Rømer Aagaard Sandberg, politician (died 1985)
5 August – Sverre Sørsdal, boxer and Olympic silver medallist (died 1996)
14 August – Arne Korsmo, architect (died 1968 in Norway)
29 August – Thorleif Christoffersen, Olympic gold medallist (died 1975)
13 September – Viggo Hansteen, lawyer and politician, executed (died 1941)
17 September  – Martha Ostenso, Canadian novelist and screenwriter (died 1963)
22 September – Ruth Krefting, painter and playwright (died 1987).
23 September – Jørgen Vogt, newspaper editor and politician (died 1972)
26 September – Hjalmar Strømme, boxer (died 1925)
30 September – Erling Johan Vindenes, politician (died 1984)
8 October – Torstein Selvik, politician (died 1983)
14 October – Arne Mortensen, rower and Olympic bronze medallist (died 1942)
18 October – Jens Schive, journalist and diplomat (died 1962)
15 December – Arthur Olsen, boxer (died 1951)
24 December – Dagfinn Zwilgmeyer, psalmist (died 1979).
30 December – Lillemor von Hanno, actress and writer (died 1984).

Full date unknown
Eivind Stenersen Engelstad, archaeologist and art historian (died 1969)
Gunnar Emil Garfors, poet (died 1979)
Gunnar Larsen, journalist, writer and translator (died 1958)
Einar Skjæraasen, author (died 1966)

Notable deaths

13 January – Peter Waage, chemist and professor (born 1833)
28 May – Morten Diderik Emil Lambrechts, jurist and politician (born 1824)
29 July – Sigbjørn Obstfelder, writer (born 1866)

Full date unknown
Christen Christensen, military officer and politician (born 1826)
Thomas Henrik Hammer, jurist and politician (born 1815)
Henrik Laurentius Helliesen, politician and Minister (born 1824)
Jacob Lerche Johansen, politician and Minister (born 1818)
Niels Mathiesen, politician and merchant (born 1829)
Bernt Julius Muus, Lutheran minister (born 1832)
Augusta Schrumpf, actress and opera singer (born 1813)

See also

References